Sekhemre-Heruhirmaat Intef (or Antef, Inyotef, sometimes referred to as Intef VII) was an ancient Egyptian king of the Seventeenth Dynasty of Egypt, who ruled during the Second Intermediate Period, when Egypt was divided between the Theban-based 17th Dynasty in Upper Egypt and the Hyksos 15th Dynasty who controlled Lower and part of Middle Egypt.

Sekhemre-Heruhirmaat Intef is referred to as Intef VII in some literature, while others refer to him as Intef VIII.

Sekhemre-Heruhirmaat Intef ruled from Thebes, and was buried in a tomb in the 17th Dynasty royal necropolis at Dra' Abu el-Naga'.

Brief reign
His only clear attestation is his coffin – Louvre E 3020 – now in France. His sarcophagus contained the corrected nomen of this king as well as his prenomen, Sekhemre-Heruhirmaat, "which was added in ink on the chest of the coffin." Little more is known concerning the reign of this king except that he was a short-lived successor of Nubkheperre Intef. The Danish Egyptologist Kim Ryholt has argued that Sekhemre-Heruhirmaat Intef was possibly a co-regent of Nubkheperre Intef based on a block from Koptos, which preserves
 
Ryholt observes that the length of the damaged cartouche would fit well with the long prenomen of Sekhemre-Heruhirmaat.

Ryholt suggested that Sekhemre-Heruhirmaat Intef died prematurely and was buried in a royal coffin that initially belonged to Nubkheperre Intef; hence, Sekhemre-Heruhirmaat Intef did not enjoy an independent reign of his own. The British Egyptologist Aidan Dodson, however, criticises Ryholt's proposal that Sekhemre-Heruhirmaat Intef died during the reign of his predecessor and was buried in Sekhemre-Wepmaat Intef's original royal coffin. Dodson observes that the form of the name Intef written here (which was originally similar to that used to designate Nubkheperre Intef before it was amended for Sekhemre-Heruhirmaat Intef) and the added king's prenomen of Sekhemre-Heruhirmaat on this king's coffin was composed in an entirely different hand from the remaining texts on the coffin. Dodson also stresses that

Dodson's previous explanation derives from his GM 120 (1991) article where the author argues that Sekhemre-Heruhirmaat Intef was most probably a short-lived Theban king who died within months of his accession to power since the temple "scribes were probably still used to writing Inyotef in the manner of Nubkheperre [Intef] [sc. with the reed-leaf: in-it=f], leading to the corrected mistake on the coffin [of Sekhemre-Heruhirmaat Intef]".

This would also explain the modesty of Sekhemre-Heruhirmaat Intef's coffin, which lacked a royal uraeus and is stylistically similar to the clearly non-royal coffin of Kamose. Intef, hence, would not have had the time to create a proper royal coffin in his abbreviated reign.

The prominent German Egyptologist Daniel Polz who rediscovered the tomb of the powerful 17th Dynasty king Nubkheperre Intef at Dra' Abu el-Naga' in 2001 also places Sekhemre-Heruhirmaat Intef as a short-lived successor of this influential pharaoh in a 2007 book just prior to the accession of Senakhtenre Ahmose.

References

16th-century BC Pharaohs
Pharaohs of the Seventeenth Dynasty of Egypt